Metzenbaum scissors are surgical scissors designed for cutting delicate tissue and blunt dissection. The scissors come in variable lengths and have a relatively high shank-to-blade ratio. They are constructed of stainless steel and may have tungsten carbide cutting surface inserts. The blades can be curved or straight, and the tips are usually blunt. This is the most common type of scissors used in organ-related operations.

Etymology
The name Metzenbaum derives from the designer, Myron Firth Metzenbaum (1 April 1876 – 25 January 1944), an American surgeon who specialized in oral and reconstructive surgery. They are also occasionally referred to as Metzenbaum or Metzenbaum–Lahey forceps.

See also
 Mayo scissors
 Surgical instrument
 Surgical scissors

References

External links
 Photos of Metzenbaum scissors
 Metzenbaum Scissors Vs. Mayo Scissors

Surgical scissors

de:Chirurgische Schere
pl:Nożyczki chirurgiczne
pt:Tesoura Metzenbaum